Dodik is a surname. Notable people with the surname include:

 Milorad Dodik (born 1959), Bosnian Serb politician
 Marijo Dodik (born 1974), Bosnian football player

See also 
 Dodig

Bosnian surnames
Croatian surnames
Serbian surnames